Dan Villegas is a Filipino cinematographer and director. He won the 2014 Metro Manila Film Festival Best Director award for his film English Only, Please. He graduated from Ateneo de Manila University. He also took up film courses at the Marilou Diaz Abaya Film Institute and  Berlinale Talents in Europe.

Filmography

Film

Television

Awards

References

External links

Living people
Filipino film directors
Year of birth missing (living people)
Place of birth missing (living people)